Protein combining or protein complementing is a dietary theory for protein nutrition that purports to optimize the biological value of protein intake. According to the theory, vegetarian and vegan diets may provide an insufficient amount of some essential amino acids, making protein combining with multiple foods necessary to obtain a complete protein food. The terms complete and incomplete are outdated in relation to plant protein. The position of the Academy of Nutrition and Dietetics is that protein from a variety of plant foods eaten during the course of a day supplies enough of all essential amino acids when caloric requirements are met.

Though it is undisputed that diverse foods can be combined to make up for their respective limiting amino acids, a general consensus has emerged among nutrition scientists and writers contrary to the original vegetarian nutrition dogmas of the 1970s. Though historically, protein combining was promoted as a method of compensating for supposed deficiencies in vegetables as foods, studies on essential amino acid contents in plant proteins have shown that vegetarians and vegans typically do not need to complement plant proteins in each meal to reach the desired level of essential amino acids as long as their diets are varied and caloric requirements are met. The American Dietetic Association and Dietitians of Canada support this position. In fact, the American Dietetic Association states that complementary proteins do not need to be consumed at the same meal and plant proteins can meet all requirements.

It is however indeed possible for one to develop an amino acid deficiency if they, for example, ate solely rice and in quantities limited to that necessary to meet caloric intake needs. To avoid such a deficiency, either a complementary food high in the limiting amino acid (such as legumes which are high in lysine, in the case of rice) or quantities of rice greater than that necessary to meet caloric intake needs would be required. This is not an issue when eating a varied diet. Amino acids are not stored and may be excreted sooner than complemented, under limiting conditions.

Concept
Protein nutrition is complex because any proteinogenic amino acid may be the limiting factor in metabolism. Mixing livestock feeds can optimize for growth, or minimize cost while maintaining adequate growth. Similarly, human nutrition is subject to Liebig's law of the minimum: The lowest level of one of the essential amino acids will be the limiting factor in metabolism.
If the content of a single indispensable amino acid in the diet is less than the individual’s requirement, then it will limit the utilization of other amino acids and thus prevent the normal rates of synthesis even when the total nitrogen intake level is adequate. Thus the "limiting amino acid" will determine the nutritional value of the total nitrogen or protein in the diet.

Plants are thus rated as protein sources by their limiting amino acids.

Examples of "limiting" amino acids in plant protein 
According to WHO, human need for proteins is 0.66 g per kg of bodyweight per day. For a 70 kg person has an estimated protein requirement of 46.2g (70 kg x 0,66 g/kg).

In addition, there is a specific need of essential amino acids quantities. See Essential amino acid#Recommended daily intake for a table of the values; the tables below use a percentage of the requirement.

In the above examples, neither whole rice nor canned chickpeas have sufficient amounts of all required amino acids when used as the only source of 46.2 g of daily protein. The insufficient amino acid is called the "limiting" amino acid: for rice it's lysine and for chickpeas it's methionine. Consuming the specific quantity for long periods of time might result in deficiency of the amino acid.

In the above example, the combination of both whole rice and canned chickpeas has no limiting amino acids, that means that only consuming rice and chickpeas, in these specific quantities of 306g/day and 261g/day respectively, for long periods of time, would not result in any of the essential amino acid deficiency, at least to the extent they are metabolized at the time.

As the data of the example show, all essential amino acids are found in a specific plant, however one of them may or may not be limiting, that is, present in quantities below the WHO daily recommendation. For this reasons vegan and vegetarian diets need to be varied in terms of plants consumed.

Plant protein research
The first biochemist to enter the field was Karl Heinrich Ritthausen, a student of Justus von Liebig. Thomas Burr Osborne continued what Ritthausen started and published The Vegetable Proteins in 1909. Thus Yale University was the early center of protein nutrition, where William Cumming Rose was a student. Osborne also worked to determine the essentials, and later led the Biochemistry Department at the University of Chicago.

When Ritthausen died in 1912, Osborne praised his efforts in biochemistry:
As a result of his later work he proved that wide differences exist between different food proteins; and he was the first to direct attention to this fact, and to discuss its probable bearing on their relative value in nutrition.

Osborne then joined forces with Lafayette Mendel at the Connecticut Agricultural Experiment Station to determine the essential amino acids.

In the 1950s and 1960s, Nevin S. Scrimshaw took this knowledge to India and Guatemala. He designed meals using local vegetables to fight against the scourge of kwashiorkor. In Guatemala he used the combination of cottonseed flour with maize, while in India he combined peanut flour with wheat.

Popularization
In 1954, Adelle Davis published Let's Eat Right to Keep Fit, which described the importance of combining "incomplete" proteins to make "complete" proteins, and advised that any incomplete proteins not complemented within one hour could not be used by the body.

In 1971, Frances Moore Lappé published Diet for a Small Planet, which explained how essential amino acids might be obtained from complementary sources in vegetarian nutrition. The book became a bestseller :
An extension of a one-page handout that Lappé had circulated among her fellow improvisors in Berkeley, Diet for a Small Planet (1971) soon became the vegetarian text of the ecology movement, selling in the next ten years almost two million copies in three editions and six languages.

Lappé wrote:
Complementary protein combinations make for delicious recipes – they are combinations that formed the basis of the world’s traditional cuisines. We use them naturally in our cooking without even being aware of it. The three most common complementary protein combinations are:
Grains (rice, corn, wheat, barley, etc.) + legumes (peas, beans, lentils)
Grains and milk products
Seeds (Sesame or sunflower) +legumes

In 1975, both Vogue and American Journal of Nursing carried articles describing the principles and practice of protein combining. 
For a time, 
The American National Research Council and the American Dietetic Association (ADA) cautioned vegetarians to be sure to combine their proteins.

In 1985, the principle of protein combining was explained by J. Rigó:
The biological value of proteins in general, hence also of grain-proteins, is fundamentally determined by the ratio between the essential amino acids to be found in cereals and the requirement of essential amino acids of the living creature, consuming protein...the most important way of raising the biological value ... [is] given by the technique of complementing.

In 2011 PLOS ONE published an article investigating the specifics of protein combining for 1251 plant-based foods. The bases of reference are the amino acids indispensable to human nutrition, and the ideal proportioning of these amino acids in a meal. They explain, "complementation involves consuming two or more foods together to yield an amino acid pattern that is better than the sum of the two foods alone."  In contrast to pairings based on food groups, such as pairing a grain with a bean, the investigators reported that pairing by food group was not supported by their work: "Examining the top 100 pairings for each food, we found no consistent pattern of food group-food group pairings."

Criticism

Protein combining has drawn criticism as an unnecessary complicating factor in nutrition.

In 1981,    Frances Moore Lappé changed her position on protein combining from a decade prior in a revised edition of  Diet for a Small Planet in which she wrote:

"In 1971 I stressed protein complementarity because I assumed that the only way to get enough protein ... was to create a protein as usable by the body as animal protein. In combating the myth that meat is the only way to get high-quality protein, I reinforced another myth. I gave the impression that in order to get enough protein without meat, considerable care was needed in choosing foods. Actually, it is much easier than I thought.

"With three important exceptions, there is little danger of protein deficiency in a plant food diet. The exceptions are diets very heavily dependent on [1] fruit or on [2] some tubers, such as sweet potatoes or cassava, or on [3] junk food (refined flours, sugars, and fat). Fortunately, relatively few people in the world try to survive on diets in which these foods are virtually the sole source of calories. In all other diets, if people are getting enough calories, they are virtually certain of getting enough protein."

Necessity of protein combining was not asserted. Rather, the increased biological value of meals where proteins are combined was noted. In a concession, Lappé removed from the second edition "charts that indicate exact proportions of complementary proteins".

The American Dietetic Association reversed itself in its 1988 position paper on vegetarianism. Suzanne Havala, the primary author of the paper, recalls the research process:
There was no basis for [protein combining] that I could see.... I began calling around and talking to people and asking them what the justification was for saying that you had to complement proteins, and there was none. And what I got instead was some interesting insight from people who were knowledgeable and actually felt that there was probably no need to complement proteins. So we went ahead and made that change in the paper.  [Note: The paper was approved by peer review and by a delegation vote before becoming official.]

In 1994, Vernon Young and Peter Pellett published their paper that became the definitive contemporary guide to protein metabolism in humans. It also confirmed that complementing proteins at meals was totally unnecessary. Thus, people who avoid consuming animal protein do not need to be at all concerned about amino acid imbalances from the plant proteins that make up their usual diets.

While many plant proteins are lower in one or more essential amino acids than animal proteins, especially lysine, and to a lesser extent methionine and threonine, eating a variety of plants can serve as a well-balanced and complete source of amino acids.

Pediatrician Charles R. Attwood wrote, "The old ideas about the necessity of carefully combining vegetables at every meal to ensure the supply of essential amino acids has been totally refuted."

In 2002, Dr. John McDougall wrote a correction to the American Heart Association for a 2001 publication that questioned the completeness of plant proteins, and further asserted that "it is impossible to design an amino acid–deficient diet based on the amounts of unprocessed starches and vegetables sufficient to meet the calorie needs of humans."

Later that year, Dr. Andrew Weil wrote that "you don’t have to worry that you won’t get enough usable protein if you don’t put together some magical combination of foods at each meal."

In Healthy Times Jeff Novick wrote that the necessity of protein combining is a "myth that won’t go away".

In 2005, Dr. Joel Fuhrman wrote:
...plant foods have plenty of protein and you do not have to be a nutritional scientist or dietitian to figure out what to eat and you don’t need to mix and match foods to achieve protein completeness.  Any combination of natural foods will supply you with adequate protein, including all eight essential amino acids as well as unessential amino acids.

Dr. T. Colin Campbell wrote in 2006:
We now know that through enormously complex metabolic systems, the human body can derive all the essential amino acids from the natural variety of plant proteins that we encounter every day. It doesn’t require eating higher quantities of plant protein or meticulously planning every meal.

In 2009, the American Dietetic Association wrote: 
Plant protein can meet protein requirements when a variety of plant foods is consumed and energy needs are met. Research indicates that an assortment of plant foods eaten over the course of a day can provide all essential amino acids and ensure adequate nitrogen retention and use in healthy adults, thus, complementary proteins do not need to be consumed at the same meal.

The American Heart Association now states:
You don’t need to eat foods from animals to have enough protein in your diet. Plant proteins alone can provide enough of the essential and non-essential amino acids, as long as sources of dietary protein are varied and caloric intake is high enough to meet energy needs. Whole grains, legumes, vegetables, seeds and nuts all contain both essential and non-essential amino acids. You don’t need to consciously combine these foods (“complementary proteins”) within a given meal.

Some institutions use the Protein Digestibility Corrected Amino Acid Score to assess diets without consideration of protein combining and hence find the use of combinations to be a challenge to their methodology.

On the other hand, the site 2000KCAL.CZ asserts that any regular-sized protein source can be converted into a high-quality protein if combined with a small quantity of whey protein supplement. Without making a direct case for or against the practice of protein combining, the site challenges the notion that protein combining has to be complicated.

References

External links
 When Your Friends Ask: "Where Do You Get Your Protein", McDougall Newsletter
 The Protein-Combining Myth, NutritionFacts.org
 The Myth of Complementary Protein, Forks Over Knives
 Plant-Based Protein: Requirements, Foods, Combinations, Holy Peas

Nutrition
Vegetarianism
Proteins as nutrients